Miletus ancon is a butterfly in the family Lycaenidae. It is found in Southeast Asia.

Subspecies
 Miletus ancon ancon (Burma: Shan States, Karen Hills, Tavoy)
 Miletus ancon gigas (H. H. Druce, 1895) (Borneo)

References

Butterflies described in 1889
Miletus (butterfly)
Butterflies of Borneo
Butterflies of Asia